Munkong "Turbo" Sathienthirakul (born 6 October 1985) is a Thai racing driver currently competing in the TCR Asia Series. Having previously competed in the Thailand Super Series and Thai Touring Car Championship amongst others.

Racing career
Sathienthirakul began his career in 2000 in karting, he won three titles in karting up until 2002. In 2010 he switched to the Thai Touring Car Championship. He raced in the Thai Honda Civic Cup in 2011, before switching to the Thailand Super Series, he finished the 2014 season 2nd in the championship standings.

In October 2015 it was announced that he would race in the TCR Asia Series & TCR International Series, driving a SEAT León Cup Racer for Craft-Bamboo Racing.

Racing record

Complete TCR International Series results
(key) (Races in bold indicate pole position) (Races in italics indicate fastest lap)

Complete TCR Europe Series results
(key) (Races in bold indicate pole position) (Races in italics indicate fastest lap)

† Driver did not finish, but was classified as he completed over 75% of the race distance.

References

External links
 

1985 births
Living people
TCR Asia Series drivers
TCR International Series drivers
Munkong Sathienthirakul
24H Series drivers
Engstler Motorsport drivers
Craft-Bamboo Racing drivers
TCR Europe Touring Car Series drivers